This is a list of dates for Easter. The Easter dates also affect when Ash Wednesday, Maundy Thursday, Good Friday, Holy Saturday, Feast of the Ascension and Pentecost occur, consequently determining the liturgical year except the calendar of saints, feasts of the Annunciation and the nativities of St. John, the Baptist and Jesus. Easter may occur on different dates in the Gregorian Calendar (Western) and the Julian Calendar (Orthodox or Eastern). The accompanying table provides both sets of dates, for recent and forthcoming years — see the computus article for more details on the calculation.

Earliest Easter

Western (Gregorian)
In 1818 the Paschal Full Moon fell on Saturday, March 21 (the equinox). Therefore, the following day, March 22 and the 81st day of the year, was Easter. It will not fall as early again until 2285, a span of 467 years.
The next earliest Easter, March 23, in that timespan occurred in 1845, 1856, 1913, and 2008. Easter will next occur on March 23 in 2160. These are gaps of 11, 57, 95 and 152 years.
Easter last occurred on March 24 in 1940 and will not occur on that day again until 2391, a 451-year gap.

The earliest week by international standard reckoning is W12, and the 12th Sunday of the year is also the earliest possible Easter Sunday.

Orthodox (Julian)
The earliest dates for Easter in the Eastern Orthodox Church between 1875 and 2099 are April 4, 1915 and April 4, 2010 (Gregorian). Both dates are equivalent to 22 March in the Julian Calendar.

Latest Easter

Western (Gregorian)
In 1943 Easter fell on Sunday, April 25, the 115th day of the year. The last ecclesiastical full moon preceding the Paschal did not occur until March 20; prior to March 21, the fixed date to which the vernal equinox is assigned for the purposes of the computus, meaning the Paschal full moon did not happen until Sunday, April 18. Consequently, Easter was the following Sunday, April 25. Easter will next occur as late again in 2038 — a span of 95 years. Easter may also occur on April 25 of a leap year, i.e. the 116th day of the year, but this has never occurred since the Gregorian reforms were implemented. The first time Easter will occur on April 25 in a leap year will be in 3784. 
This is also the only case where Easter is in ISO week W17, otherwise all occurrences after April 18 and on this day in leap years are in W16. 
In several cases, Easter falls onto the latest possible, 17th Sunday of the year.

The second latest date for Easter, April 24 or day 114, occurred in 2011. The last time this occurred before was in 1859 and it will not happen again until 2095—spans of 152 and 84 years. Easter also occurred on the 114th day of the year on April 23 in 2000, a leap year.

Orthodox (Julian)
The latest dates for Orthodox Easter between 1875 and 2099 are May 8, 1983, and May 8, 2078 (Gregorian). Both dates are equivalent to April 25 in the Julian Calendar. Orthodox Easter has never fallen on Gregorian May 7 yet; it will happen in 2051 unless these churches change to another calendar.

Beginning March 14, 2100 (February 29, 2100, in the Julian Calendar), the difference between the Julian and Gregorian calendars will increase to 14 days.

Western and Orthodox Easter on the same date 
Despite using calendars that are apart by 13 days, Western Easter and Orthodox Easter occasionally fall on the same date, as happened in 2010, 2011, 2014, and 2017. For example, according to the Western (Gregorian) calendar, the first Paschal Full Moon after the Spring Equinox (March 21) fell on Monday, April 14, 2014. The following Sunday, April 20, was, therefore, Easter Day.

According to the Orthodox (Julian) calendar (which is 13 days behind the Gregorian calendar), the Spring Equinox also falls on March 21. However, in the Gregorian Calendar, this is April 3. The first Orthodox Full Moon after the Equinox falls on (Julian) Tuesday, April 2, 2014 (Gregorian April 15). The following Sunday, (Julian) April 7, is, therefore, Easter Day (Gregorian April 20).

Range of dates for Western and Orthodox Easter 
Both calendars (Gregorian and Julian) calculate Easter as falling on dates between March 22 and April 25 on their calendars. However, because of the 13-day difference, any member of an Orthodox church would observe that the Western Easter falls between March 10 and April 12 on the Julian calendar. Conversely, any member of a Western church would observe that Orthodox Easter falls between April 4 and May 8 on the Gregorian calendar.

Sundays on the dates March 22 through April 25 in the Gregorian calendar may be the 81st through 115th day of common years or 82nd through 116th day of leap years. They occur as the last day of ISO week number W12 through W17 and are also the 12th through 17th Sunday of the year, but these numbers mismatch in some years.

Public holidays 

In Canada, Hungary, Kenya, the United Kingdom (except Scotland), Hong Kong, Australia, South Africa, Slovakia, Germany, Serbia, Sweden, Switzerland and New Zealand, Easter has two public holidays, Good Friday and Easter Monday, making a four-day weekend. The movable date of Easter sometimes brings it into conflict with other, fixed or moveable, public holidays.
In the United Kingdom in 2000 and 2011, the May Day bank holiday was one week after Easter Monday, causing there to be three consecutive weeks with a bank holiday. (In Scotland this did not occur as Easter Monday is not a bank holiday.) In 2011, a bank holiday was declared on Friday 29 April for the wedding of Prince William and Catherine Middleton; consequently there were four bank holidays within three consecutive calendar weeks (including two in one week), creating two consecutive four-day weekends (Friday 22 – Monday 25 April and Friday 29 April – Monday 2 May), with a three-day working week in between (Tuesday 26 – Thursday 28 April).
In Northern Ireland and the Republic of Ireland in 2008, Saint Patrick's Day (Monday 17 March) fell six days before Easter (Sunday 23 March), creating a three-day week (Tuesday 18 – Thursday 20 March). This will next happen in 2035, when Saint Patrick's Day falls on Saturday, so the public holiday is moved forward to the following Monday 19 March, again six days before Easter.
In the Catholic liturgical calendar, saints' feasts are not observed when they fall during Holy Week; this caused Saint Patrick not to appear in the liturgical calendar for 2008; 17 March was simply celebrated as Holy Monday. In Ireland, the Church chose to celebrate Saint Patrick on Saturday 15 March instead.
In Australia and New Zealand, ANZAC Day is a public holiday on 25 April. In 2000 and 2011, this created a five-day weekend over Easter: in 2000, Easter Monday fell on 24 April, with the following Tuesday, 25 April, then being ANZAC Day; in 2011, ANZAC Day and Easter Monday coincided on Monday 25 April, which led to a substitute public holiday being declared in Australia for Tuesday 26 April, and likely contributed to New Zealand's introduction of Mondayising legislation in 2013. In 2003 and 2014, ANZAC Day fell on the Friday after Easter, and in 2019 it fell on the Thursday after Easter, and in 2038 it will fall on Easter Sunday; the consequence is three-day working weeks immediately following the Easter weekend.
In Hong Kong in 2021, Easter Sunday (4 April) coincided with the Ching Ming (Qingming) Festival, leading to public holidays on Monday 5 April (the day after Ching Ming) and Tuesday 6 April (the day after Easter Monday), and a five-day weekend (Friday 2 – Tuesday 6 April).
Easter is not a federal holiday in the United States. In North Carolina, however, it was a public holiday from 1935 to 1987.
In Norway Easter is celebrated with public holidays on the Thursday and Good Friday before, and Easter Monday, but schools and businesses traditionally have a half-day on the Wednesday as well. The same goes for Denmark.

References

External links 
 List of Easter Sunday Dates (1700–2299) by Astronomical Society of South Australia
 A chronology since Council Nicaea "Date of Easter Sunday" Father Kevin Michael Laughery, as observed by Western Christians since A.D. 326 (last updated Monday, February 28, 2022; this site now only covers 1818–2105)
 Interactive calculator generates historical feast dates in Julian calendar prior to 1582 Gregorian reforms
 Side-by-side Easter reference, Orthodox and Catholic dates in the Gregorian and Julian calendars tabular data, full centuries.

Easter
Easter date